Alan Tait (born 27 December 1953) is a former English cricketer. He played for Northamptonshire between 1971 and 1975 and for Gloucestershire in 1978.

References

External links

1953 births
Living people
English cricketers
Gloucestershire cricketers
Northamptonshire cricketers
People from Washington, Tyne and Wear
Cricketers from Tyne and Wear
Cambridgeshire cricketers